Crispin may refer to:

People
 Crispin (given name)
 Crispin (surname)
 Crispin and Crispinian, Christian saints
 Crispin of Pavia, Bishop of Pavia and saint
 Crispin, Bishop of Csanád
 Crispin of Viterbo (1668–1750), Italian saint and member of the Order of Friars Minor Capuchin

Ships
 , a cargo ship built in 1907 and sunk in 1917
 , a cargo ship and ocean boarding vessel launched in 1934 and sunk in 1941
 , a destroyer launched in 1945 and renamed PNS Jahangir in 1956

Books
 Crispin: The Cross of Lead, a 2002 children's novel
 Crispin: At the Edge of the World, a 2006 children's novel
 Crispin: The Pig Who Had It All, a 2000 picture book by Ted Dewan

Characters
 Crispin (Shannara), a character in Terry Brooks' Shannara novels
 Crispin (wizard), a character in King's Quest V: Absence Makes the Heart Go Yonder! video game
 Crispin, a character in The Mistmantle Chronicles by M. I. McAllister
 Crispin, a supporting character from the 2003 film Daddy Day Care

Other uses
 Crispin (apple) or Mutsu apple, a cross between the Golden Delicious and the Indo apple varieties
 Crispin Hard Cider Company
 Crispin School, a secondary school in Street, Somerset, England
 Crispin, the subject of Wallace Stevens' long poem "The Comedian as the Letter 'C'"
 Crispin, a trade name for tramadol

See also
 St Crispins Hospital, a psychiatric hospital in Duston, Northamptonshire, England
 St Crispin's School, a co-educational comprehensive school in Wokingham, Berkshire, England
 Crispin rival de son maître, a one-act farce by Alain-René Lesage that was first produced in 1707
 Order of the Knights of St. Crispin, American labor union of shoeworkers
 Saint Crispin's Day, the feast day of the Christian saints Crispin and Crispinian
 St Crispin Street Fair, annual fun fair held in town centre streets of Northampton, England
 Crispian
 Crispiano, town and comune in southeast Italy